AMPERS (Association of Minnesota Public Educational Radio Stations) is an association of 18 independent community radio stations in Minnesota. Each station is locally managed and programmed by and for the local community it serves. AMPERS is the largest statewide association of community radio stations in the United States. The stations primarily serve underserved populations including greater Minnesota, diverse communities, and students for a combined audience of about 300,000 listeners. AMPERS has no affiliation with Minnesota Public Radio (MPR) and receives no financial support from MPR.

AMPERS Member Stations

External links
AMPERS

American radio networks
Community radio in the United States
Independent Public Radio
Radio in Minnesota
Non-profit organizations based in Minnesota
Organizations based in Saint Paul, Minnesota